Wolfinger is a surname. It may refer to:

August Wolfinger (born 1949), Liechtenstein alpine skier
Fabio Wolfinger (born 1996), Liechtenstein footballer 
Joe Wolfinger (born 1985), American basketball player 
Joseph Wolfinger, Sr. (1857–1941), American businessman, inventor and politician
Nicholas H. Wolfinger, American researcher, academic and educator
Ray Wolfinger (1931–2015), American political scientist and professor
Sandro Wolfinger (born 1991), Liechtenstein football player 
Weltin Wolfinger (1926–2010), Liechtenstein bobsledder

German-language surnames